The Bishop of Bunbury is the diocesan bishop of the Anglican Diocese of Bunbury, Australia.

List of Bishops of Bunbury
References

External links

 – official site

 
Lists of Anglican bishops and archbishops
Anglican bishops of Bunbury